Jesus Joaquin Gaquit Melliza (born April 20, 1992), nicknamed Jhan or Jess Melliza, is a Filipino professional footballer who plays as a attacking midfielder or winger for Philippines Football League (PFL) club Kaya–Iloilo and the Philippines national team.

Early life
A native of La Paz, Iloilo City, Melliza was born on April 20, 1992.

Collegiate career
Melliza played for the Far Eastern University in the football tournament of the University Athletic Association of the Philippines (UAAP). He ended his college stint with FEU in 2015 by helping his varsity team win the UAAP Season 77 football title.

Club career

Green Archers United
Melliza was already suiting up for Green Archers United of the United Football League while he was still playing college football for FEU.

Stallion Laguna
He was later signed in by Stallion Laguna by May 2017 to play at the Philippines Football League (PFL). He was the top Filipino scorer in the PFL inaugural season.

Kaya-Iloilo
Melliza and Stallion teammate Fitch Arboleda joined Kaya–Iloilo in March 2021.

International career

Philippines U23
He was to play for the under-23 team of the Philippines at the 2015 Southeast Asian Games in Singapore but he was cut out from the final squad due to paperwork issues.

Philippines
Melliza earned his first call up for the Philippines senior national team in October 2017 for the 2019 AFC Asian Cup third round qualifier match against Yemen, however, he had yet to earn an international cap for the team. In June 2022, he made his debut for the Philippines in a 1–0 win against Mongolia in the third round of the 2023 AFC Asian Cup qualifiers.

Career statistics

Club

International goals
Scores and results list the Philippines' goal tally first.

References

1992 births
Living people
Sportspeople from Iloilo City
Stallion Laguna F.C. players
Filipino footballers
Association football forwards